Francisco Bosch (born 5 October 1982) is a Spanish actor and dancer. He was born in Valencia.

His interest in dance began when his grandmother took him to a meeting of her flamenco group when he was five years old. He began his dance training at Conservatorio Professional de Danza in Valencia and continued study at the Conservatorio de Danza in Madrid then joined Nacho Duato's Compania Nacional de Danza. In 2002, he joined the English National Ballet.

He played Bagoas opposite Colin Farrell in the 2004 Oliver Stone film Alexander. Their love scene was cut before distribution, as it was said to be too explicit. The dance scene shown in the movie has been detailed in Suzanne Gielgud's Dancing For Oliver documentary where Francisco is also interviewed.

Francisco has also completed filming in the 2006 films Nina's Heavenly Delights and Russell Mulcahy The Curse of King Tut's Tomb TV series. Francisco appeared in The Magic Flute 2006 adaptation of Mozart's opera by Kenneth Branagh. He was next in Layke Anderson's House of Boys, written by Jean-Claude Schlim.

In a 23 July 2013 interview with Out in the City magazine, Bosch confirmed that he is gay.

References

External links

 Francisco Bosch's Official Website

1982 births
Living people
People from Valencia
Spanish gay actors
Gay dancers
Spanish male television actors
Actors from the Valencian Community
Spanish male ballet dancers
Spanish male film actors
English National Ballet dancers